The Read Russia Prize awards are made every two years for outstanding translations of Russian literature into foreign languages.

About the prize 
Established in 2011 by the Institute for Literary Translation, the awards are supported by the Federal Agency for Press and Mass Communication (Rospechat’) and the Boris N. Yeltsin Presidential Center. They are awarded to a translator (or group of translators) for works published in translation by a foreign publisher during the previous two years. There are four categories of awards. The winner(s) receive an award of up to $10,000, divided between the translator(s) of the work and the publishing house(s).

References

Translation awards